"Cry Cry ('Til the Sun Shines)" is a song originally recorded by Martina McBride on her 2007 album Waking Up Laughing.  It was later recorded by American country music artist Heidi Newfield and released in November 2008 as the second single from the album What Am I Waiting For.  The song reached #29 on the Billboard Hot Country Songs chart.  The song was written by Marv Green, Aimee Mayo, Chris Lindsey and Hillary Lindsey.

Chart performance

References

2008 singles
2007 songs
Martina McBride songs
Heidi Newfield songs
Songs written by Marv Green
Songs written by Chris Lindsey
Songs written by Hillary Lindsey
Songs written by Aimee Mayo
Song recordings produced by Tony Brown (record producer)
Curb Records singles